Longilepturges is a genus of beetles in the family Cerambycidae, containing the following species:

 Longilepturges bicolor Monne & Monne, 2011
 Longilepturges xantholineatus Monne & Monne, 2011

References

Acanthocinini